The 2022 Indonesia Masters (officially known as the Daihatsu Indonesia Masters 2022 for sponsorship reasons) was a badminton tournament that took place at the Istora Gelora Bung Karno, Jakarta, Indonesia, from 7 to 12 June 2022 and had a total prize of US$360,000.

Tournament
The 2022 Indonesia Masters was the tenth tournament of the 2022 BWF World Tour and was part of the Indonesia Masters championships, which had been held since 2010. This tournament was organized by the Badminton Association of Indonesia with sanction from the BWF.

Venue
This international tournament took place at the Istora Gelora Bung Karno inside the Gelora Bung Karno Sports Complex in Central Jakarta, Jakarta, Indonesia.

Point distribution
Below is the point distribution table for each phase of the tournament based on the BWF points system for the BWF World Tour Super 500 event.

Prize pool
The total prize money was US$360,000 with the distribution of the prize money in accordance with BWF regulations.

Controversy
On 10 June, reports emerged that players from several countries were hospitalized for food poisoning. The situation is currently being investigated by the Badminton Association of Indonesia and the Badminton World Federation.

Men's singles

Seeds 

 Viktor Axelsen (champion)
 Anders Antonsen (withdrew)
 Chou Tien-chen (final)
 Anthony Sinisuka Ginting (semi-finals)
 Lee Zii Jia (quarter-finals)
 Jonatan Christie (first round)
 Lakshya Sen (quarter-finals)
 Loh Kean Yew (semi-finals)

Finals

Top half

Section 1

Section 2

Bottom half

Section 3

Section 4

Women's singles

Seeds 

 Chen Yufei (champion)
 An Se-young (second round)
 Carolina Marín (withdrew)
 P. V. Sindhu (quarter-finals)
 Ratchanok Intanon (final)
 He Bingjiao (semi-finals)
 Pornpawee Chochuwong (second round)
 Michelle Li (first round)

Finals

Top half

Section 1

Section 2

Bottom half

Section 3

Section 4

Men's doubles

Seeds 

 Marcus Fernaldi Gideon / Kevin Sanjaya Sukamuljo (semi-finals)
 Mohammad Ahsan / Hendra Setiawan (second round)
 Lee Yang / Wang Chi-lin (quarter-finals)
 Aaron Chia / Soh Wooi Yik (quarter-finals)
 Fajar Alfian / Muhammad Rian Ardianto (champions)
 Kim Astrup / Anders Skaarup Rasmussen (second round)
 Ong Yew Sin / Teo Ee Yi (first round)
 Goh Sze Fei / Nur Izzuddin (quarter-finals)

Finals

Top half

Section 1

Section 2

Bottom half

Section 3

Section 4

Women's doubles

Seeds 

 Chen Qingchen / Jia Yifan (champions)
 Lee So-hee / Shin Seung-chan (quarter-finals)
 Kim So-yeong / Kong Hee-yong (withdrew)
 Jongkolphan Kititharakul / Rawinda Prajongjai (quarter-finals)
 Gabriela Stoeva / Stefani Stoeva (first round)
 Pearly Tan / Thinaah Muralitharan (semi-finals)
 Apriyani Rahayu / Siti Fadia Silva Ramadhanti (final)
 Liu Xuanxuan / Xia Yuting (quarter-finals)

Finals

Top half

Section 1

Section 2

Bottom half

Section 3

Section 4

Mixed doubles

Seeds 

 Dechapol Puavaranukroh / Sapsiree Taerattanachai (first round)
 Zheng Siwei / Huang Yaqiong (champions)
 Wang Yilyu / Huang Dongping (quarter-finals)
 Praveen Jordan / Melati Daeva Oktavianti (second round)
 Seo Seung-jae / Chae Yoo-jung (semi-finals)
 Tang Chun Man / Tse Ying Suet (quarter-finals)
 Tan Kian Meng / Lai Pei Jing (first round)
 Marcus Ellis / Lauren Smith (second round)

Finals

Top half

Section 1

Section 2

Bottom half

Section 3

Section 4

References

External links
 Tournament Link

Indonesian Masters (badminton)
Indonesia Masters
Indonesia Masters
Indonesia Masters